The French département of Alpes-de-Haute-Provence (04) is divided into two constituencies, each of which sends one Deputy to the National Assembly of France.  In the XIII legislature, these are represented by Jean-Louis Bianco and Daniel Spagnou.  As at 2020, a total of 12 different Deputies have represented Alpes-de-Haute-Provence since single member constituencies were re-introduced in 1988.

References

Legislatures of the National Assembly (France)
Lists of members of the National Assembly (France)
Alpes-de-Haute-Provence